Beautiful Chaos may refer to:

 Beautiful Chaos (Garcia and Stohl novel)
 Beautiful Chaos (Russell novel)
 Beautiful Chaos: Greatest Hits Live, an album by Psychedelic Furs